Tom Prahl (born 5 January 1949 in Smedstorp) is a Swedish former football player and manager.

Coaching career
From 1990 to the 2000s, Prahl was one of Sweden's most successful managers, winning three league titles. He debuted in 1992 in Allsvenskan with Trelleborgs FF. He won the league since then with both Malmö FF and Halmstads BK. On 1 January 2006, he took over Viking from Roy Hodgson. 
 However, his spell with the Stavanger-based club proved unsuccessful, and he was fired in September 2006 on the back of seven losses in eight league matches, with the team on the bottom of the Norwegian Premier League table. Prahl returned to Trelleborg and managed the club until his retirement in 2011.

Honours as manager
Halmstads BK
Allsvenskan: 1997, 2000

Malmö FF
Allsvenskan: 2004

References

1949 births
Living people
Swedish footballers
Swedish football managers
Trelleborgs FF managers
Halmstads BK managers
Malmö FF managers
Viking FK managers
Swedish expatriate football managers
Swedish expatriate sportspeople in Norway
Expatriate football managers in Norway
Allsvenskan managers
Eliteserien managers
Association footballers not categorized by position